Persepolis Ganaveh F.C.  is an Iranian football club based in Ganaveh, Iran. They currently compete in the 2012–13 Iran Football's 2nd Division. They are one of the branches of Persepolis.

Season-by-Season

The table below chronicles the achievements of Persepolis Ganaveh in various competitions since 2007.

Head coaches
 Nader Jafari Monfared

See also
 Hazfi Cup
 Iran Football's 3rd Division 2011–12

References

External links
Official Website

Football clubs in Iran